Boronia oxyantha is a plant in the citrus family, Rutaceae and is endemic to a small area in the south-west of Western Australia. It is a shrub with many hairy branches, pinnate leaves and pink, four-petalled flowers that have a darker midrib.

Description
The ten stamens have a few soft hairs and a prominent swelling on the tip. The stigma is minute. Flowering occurs from August to December or February.

Taxonomy and naming
Boronia oxyantha was first formally described in 1852 by Nikolai Turczaninow and the description was published in Bulletin de la Société Impériale des Naturalistes de Moscou. The specific epithet (oxyantha) is derived from the ancient Greek words  meaning "sharp" and  meaning "flower".

Distribution and habitat
This boronia grows on breakaways and slopes between Ongerup and Hopetoun in the Mallee biogeographic region.

Conservation
Boronia oxyantha is classified as "not threatened" by the Western Australian Government Department of Parks and Wildlife.

References

oxyantha
Flora of Western Australia
Plants described in 1852
Taxa named by Nikolai Turczaninow